Oddsson is a surname. Notable people with the surname include:

Davíð Oddsson (born 1948), Icelandic politician, and the longest-serving Prime Minister of Iceland, in office from 1991 to 2004
Eirikr Oddsson, author of Hryggjarstykki, a lost kings' saga written in Old Norse in the mid-twelfth century
Jón Oddsson (born 1958), Icelandic former multi-sport athlete
Jón Oddsson Hjaltalín (1749–1835), Icelandic priest and writer

See also
First cabinet of Davíð Oddsson in Iceland was formed 30 April 1991
Second cabinet of Davíð Oddsson in Iceland was formed 23 April 1995
Third cabinet of Davíð Oddsson in Iceland was formed 28 May 1999
Fourth cabinet of Davíð Oddsson in Iceland was formed 23 May 2003